In the fields of computer vision and image analysis, the scale-invariant feature operator (or SFOP) is an algorithm to detect local features in images. The algorithm was published by Förstner et al. in 2009.

Algorithm
The scale-invariant feature operator (SFOP) is based on two theoretical concepts: 
spiral model
feature operator

Desired properties of keypoint detectors:
 Invariance and repeatability for object recognition
 Accuracy to support camera calibration
 Interpretability: Especially corners and circles, should be part of the detected keypoints (see figure).
 As few control parameters as possible with clear semantics
 Complementarity to known detectors

scale-invariant corner/circle detector.

Theory

Maximize the weight
Maximize the weight = 1/variance of a point 

   

comprising:

1. the image model

2. the smaller eigenvalue of the structure tensor

Reduce the search space
Reduce the 5-dimensional search space by
linking the differentiation scale  to the integration scale

solving for the optimal  using the model

and determining the parameters from three angles, e. g.

pre-selection possible:

Filter potential keypoints

non-maxima suppression over scale, space and angle

thresholding the isotropy :eigenvalues characterize the shape of the keypoint, smallest eigenvalue has to be larger than threshold   derived from noise variance  and significance level :

Algorithm

Results

Interpretability of SFOP keypoints

See also

Corner detection
Feature detection (computer vision)

References

External links
 Project website at University of Bonn

Applications of computer vision
Learning in computer vision